Katharine Byron (née Edgar; October 25, 1903 – December 28, 1976), a Democrat, was a U.S. Congresswoman who represented the 6th congressional district of Maryland from May 27, 1941, to January 3, 1943. She was the first woman elected to Congress from Maryland.

Early life
Katharine Edgar was born in Detroit, Michigan on October 25, 1902, to Mary (née McComas) and Brigadier General Clinton Goodloe Edgar. She attended independent schools during her youth, such as the Liggett School in Detroit, the Westover School of Middlebury, Connecticut, and the Holton-Arms School of Bethesda, Maryland.  She later moved to Williamsport, Maryland, in 1922. The Byrons were communicants of Saint John's Church.

She was a granddaughter of U.S. Senator Louis E. McComas, who represented the 6th congressional district of Maryland.

Personal life
She married William D. Byron in 1922. Together, they had five sons:
 William Devereux Byron III (1925–1990)
 James “Jamie” Edgar Byron (1927-2011)
 Goodloe Edgar Byron (1929–1978) – a representative from the 6th district.
 David Wilson Byron (1932–1964)
 Louis McComas Byron (1938–2011)  

She married Samuel Bynum Riddick in 1947.

Career
She was elected to Congress in a special election held May 27, 1941 to replace her husband, Representative William D. Byron, after his death in an airplane crash near Atlanta, Georgia on February 27, 1941.

She advocated amending the Neutrality Act during World War II and gave one of five speeches on December 8, 1941, in favor of President Franklin Roosevelt's declaration of war on Japan.

She did not seek re-election in 1942 and retired in Washington, D.C.

Death
Byron died at Georgetown University Hospital on December 28, 1976. She is interred in Riverview Cemetery in Williamsport, Maryland.

See also
 Women in the United States House of Representatives

References

1903 births
1976 deaths
Politicians from Detroit
Politicians from Washington, D.C.
Female members of the United States House of Representatives
Women in Maryland politics
Byron family of Maryland
People from Williamsport, Maryland
Democratic Party members of the United States House of Representatives from Maryland
20th-century American politicians
20th-century American women politicians